Kronos Quartet is a studio album by the Kronos Quartet, the first of their albums on Nonesuch Records. It contains compositions by Australian composer Peter Sculthorpe, Finnish composer Aulis Sallinen, American composer Philip Glass, and American/Mexican composer Conlon Nancarrow. The last track is Jimi Hendrix's "Purple Haze."

Track listing

Critical reception

According to John Rockwell of the New York Times, "The best recorded anthology yet to capture the heady diversity of musical idioms that this San Francisco quartet espouses." Joseph McLellan, for the Washington Post, commented in a similar vein: "This group is absolutely amazing-not merely because of the superb technique with which it tackles the challenging contemporary repertoire, but even more for the breadth of vision that matter-of-factly and quite correctly includes Jimi Hendrix. . . . Hearing this music is a mind-expanding experience."

Credits

Musicians
David Harrington – violin
John Sherba – violin
Hank Dutt – viola
Joan Jeanrenaud – cello

Production
Recorded June 1985 at the American Academy of Arts and Letters, New York
Produced by Thomas Frost
John Newton – Engineer
E. Amelia Rogers – Digital Editing
Bob Ludwig – Mastering

See also
List of 1986 albums

References 

1980s classical albums
Kronos Quartet albums
Nonesuch Records albums
1986 albums